Meterana octans is a species of moth in the family Noctuidae. It was described by George Hudson in 1898 from specimens discovered by Alfred Philpott at Mount Linton, near Invercargill. It is endemic to New Zealand.

References

Moths described in 1898
Moths of New Zealand
Hadeninae
Endemic fauna of New Zealand
Endemic moths of New Zealand